There is another village named Cheekhli in Kotra Tehsil, Udaipur District, Rajasthan.

Chikhali (Cheekhli) is a panchayat village in the Vaagar area of Rajasthan, India. It is located near the Mahi River. Administratively it is under chikhali Tehsil  in Dungarpur District, Rajasthan.

There are three villages in the Chikhali gram panchayat: Chikhali, Medi Temba and Mali.

Notes and references

Villages in Dungarpur district